Sati-ye Olya (also Romanized as Sāţī-ye ‘Olyā; also known as Sāţī-ye Bālā) is a village in Shaban Rural District, in the Central District of Meshgin Shahr County, Ardabil Province, Iran. At the 2006 census, its population was 183, in 39 families.

References 

Towns and villages in Meshgin Shahr County